The Bermuda Football Association, founded in 1928, is the official football organization in Bermuda and is in charge of the Bermudian national team. The league is also in charge of the sporting leagues on the island.

Association staff

Leagues in Order from Highest to lowest 
Men
Bermudian Premier Division
First Division
Corona League
Women
Women's League
Youth
Appleby Youth League

See also 
 List of football clubs in Bermuda

References

External links
  Bermuda FA Official site
 Bermuda at FIFA site
 Bermuda at CONCACAF site
  Official Site of the Corona League, Bermuda

Football in Bermuda
CONCACAF member associations
Football
Sports organizations established in 1928
1928 establishments in Bermuda